The Institute for Credentialing Excellence (ICE) is one of the two main U.S. organizations that accredit personnel certifications or certificates. In November 2009 the ICE formally changed its name from the National Organization for Competency Assurance (NOCA).

The ICE is an accredited standards developer by the American National Standards Institute.

History 
In cooperation with the federal government, the National Commission for Health Certifying Agencies (NCHCA) was founded in 1977 in order to develop standards for voluntary certification programs. In 1989, the NCHCA was expanded to developing certifications for all professions, becoming the National Commission for Certifying Agencies (NCCA), and forming the National Organization for Competency Assurance (NOCA) as a membership association for credentialing bodies. In 2009, the Board moved to change to a new name and became the Institute for Credentialing Excellence (ICE).

National Commission for Certifying Agencies 
The National Commission for Certifying Agencies (NCCA) is the accreditation body of the Institute for Credentialing Excellence. The NCCA's Standards for the Accreditation of Certification Programs exceed the requirements set forth by the American Psychological Association and the US Equal Employment Opportunity Commission. In the state of California all organizations that wish to be recognized as counselor certifying organizations must be accredited by the NCCA.

Management structure 
The Institute for Credentialing Excellence has no employees. Instead, it pays SmithBucklin Corporation, a for-profit corporation, to employ individuals who run the Institute for Credentialing Excellence. SmithBucklin Corporation received $1.5 million out of the $2.4 million of revenue received by the Institute for Credentialing Excellence in 2018.

References 
Notes

Footnotes

External links 

Listing of programs accredited by the NCCA, Nation Commission for Certifying Agencies

Non-profit organizations based in Washington, D.C.
Organizations established in 1977